USS Santa Barbara (LCS-32) is an  of the United States Navy. She is the 32nd ship of the type, and 16th of the class, which is inter-numbered with the s. With 35 LCSs now active or planned, the type is the Navy's second largest number of surface warfare ships in production, next only to its guided missile destroyers. She is the third US Navy ship to be named for the city of Santa Barbara, California.

Design and construction
In 2002, the United States Navy initiated a program to develop the first of a fleet of littoral combat ships. The Navy initially ordered two trimaran hulled ships from General Dynamics, which became known as the Independence-class after the lead ship of the class, . Even-numbered US Navy littoral combat ships are built using the Independence-class trimaran design, while odd-numbered ships are based on a competing design, the conventional monohull Freedom-class. The initial order of littoral combat ships involved a total of four ships, including two of the Independence-class design.

Santa Barbara was built in Mobile, Alabama by Austal USA. Her keel was laid down on 27 October 2020, she was christened on 16 October 2021 and launched on 13 November 2021. Following the completion of sea trials on 3 June 2022, the ship was accepted by the Navy on 21 July 2022, with a commissioning date set for the second quarter of FY2023 (early 2024).

References

 

Proposed ships of the United States Navy
Independence-class littoral combat ships